Robert Charles Pirie (April 30, 1916 – January 22, 1984) was a Canadian freestyle swimmer, who competed internationally during the 1930s.

Background
Pirie was unanimously selected as the Lou Marsh Trophy winner for 1939, recognizing Canada's top athlete. That year, in Hawaii, he broke the 220-yard world record long held by Johnny Weissmuller and finished third in the U.S. national championships in the 110-yard and 220-yard freestyle races, with Japanese swimmers taking the top two spots in both races. At the time, he held every Canadian freestyle swimming record from 100 metres to two miles.

Earlier, Pirie won silver and bronze in freestyle events at the 1934 British Empire Games.  His sister, Irene Pirie, also won individual silver and bronze freestyle medals at the same games.  Four years later, at the 1938 British Empire Games, Pirie won gold in the 110-yard freestyle and the 440-yard freestyle events, and silver in the 1650-yard freestyle race.  Pirie attended and participated in the 1936 Summer Olympics.  In the 400-metre freestyle and 1500-metre freestyle, he was eliminated in the semi-finals.  He was also a member of the Canadian relay team which finished seventh in the 4×200-metre freestyle relay.

Pirie was inducted into the Canadian Olympic Hall of Fame in 1975. The Bob Pirie Trophy is presented each year by Swim Ontario to the top male swimmer in Ontario as selected by the Ontario Swimming Coaches' Association. The female swimmer of the year receives the Irene Pirie Trophy. Pirie was posthumously inducted into the Canada's Sports Hall of Fame in 2015.

See also
 List of Commonwealth Games medallists in swimming (men)

References

1916 births
1984 deaths
Canadian male freestyle swimmers
Commonwealth Games gold medallists for Canada
Commonwealth Games silver medallists for Canada
Commonwealth Games bronze medallists for Canada
Lou Marsh Trophy winners
Olympic swimmers of Canada
Swimmers from Toronto
Swimmers at the 1934 British Empire Games
Swimmers at the 1936 Summer Olympics
Swimmers at the 1938 British Empire Games
Commonwealth Games medallists in swimming
Medallists at the 1934 British Empire Games
Medallists at the 1938 British Empire Games